Najibabad Junction railway station is a railway station in Bijnor district, Uttar Pradesh. Its code is NBD. It serves Najibabad city. The station consists of four platforms. The platforms are well sheltered.

Trains 

Some of the trains that runs from Najibabad are:

 Jan Nayak Express
 Sidhbali Jan Shatabdi Express (previously Garhwal Express)
 Mussoorie Express 
 Varanasi – Dehradun Janta Express
 Ganga Sutlej Express 
 Rapti Ganga Express
 Kolkata–Jammu Tawi Express
 Amritsar–Saharsa Weekly Jansadharan Express
 Punjab Mail
 Harihar Express
 Ramnagar–Chandigarh Weekly InterCity Express
 Dehradun–Kathgodam Express
 Doon Express
 Jan Sewa Express 
 Haridwar–Ramnagar Intercity Express
 Amritsar–Lalkuan Express
 Amritsar–Howrah Express
 Haridwar–Allahabad Express
 Garhwal Express (now Sidhbali Jan Shatabdi Express)
 Chandigarh–Lucknow SF Express
 Najibabad–Moradabad Passenger (via Gajraula) 
 Najibabad Gajraula Passenger 
 Najibabad Kotdwara Passenger 
 Akal Takht Express

References

Railway stations in Bijnor district
Moradabad railway division